Hildrum is a Norwegian surname. Notable people with the surname include:

Alf Hildrum (born 1948), Norwegian media executive and politician 
Einar Hildrum (1902–1991), Norwegian horticulturalist
Eva Hildrum (born 1948), Norwegian civil servant

Norwegian-language surnames